Carmona is one of the 33 barangays of Makati, it is located in the northern part of the city. It is a residential area with a population of 3,109 recorded by the 2015 census. The barangay was named after Comandante Isidro Carmona, a Filipino soldier who fought during the Philippine Revolution against Spaniards.

Carmona is the 2nd least populous barangay in Makati with 3,109 residents.

History 
The full, official name of this barangay is Isidro Carmona. Its namesake was a Filipino commander who participated in several revolts during the 1896 Philippine Revolution against the Spanish Empire.
 
From the American period and under a sovereign Republic of the Philippines, the barrio was a sitio of Barrio Tejeros until the early 1960s. The barrio captains Miling Mangahas and Emiliano San Pascual, along with their respective Barrio Councils, worked to have Carmona secede from Tejeros as an independent barangay during the same period.

Landmarks 
 Circuit Makati, a 21-hectare mixed-use development on the former Sta. Ana Racetrack property of the Philippine Racing Club Inc. (PRCI). Soon to rise as Makati's entertainment district, a collaboration among Ayala Land, Inc., PRCI and the City of Makati, which completes the vision for Makati to be a leading city for entertainment, lifestyle and business.
 Maximo Estrella Elementary School, the only public elementary school in the barangay, located on J. Magsaysay Street. 
 Carmona Sports Complex, located at A. P. Reyes Avenue, is a mixed-use sports facility with parking space, maintained by the barangay government.
 Carmona Multi-purpose Hall, the seat of the Barangay Government of Carmona, located at A. P. Reyes Avenue.

References 

Barangays of Metro Manila